The 1991–92 Cypriot Second Division was the 37th season of the Cypriot second-level football league. Ethnikos Achna won their 2nd title.

Format
Fourteen teams participated in the 1991–92 Cypriot Second Division. All teams played against each other twice, once at their home and once away. The team with the most points at the end of the season crowned champions. The first two teams were promoted to 1992–93 Cypriot First Division. The last two teams were relegated to the 1992–93 Cypriot Third Division.

The 3rd-placed team faced the 12th-placed team of the 1991–92 Cypriot First Division, in a two-legged relegation play-off for one spot in the 1992–93 Cypriot First Division. The 12th-placed team faced the 3rd-placed team of the 1991–92 Cypriot Third Division, in a two-legged relegation play-off for one spot in the 1992–93 Cypriot Second Division.

Changes from previous season
Teams promoted to 1991–92 Cypriot First Division
 Evagoras Paphos
 Omonia Aradippou

Teams relegated from 1990–91 Cypriot First Division
 APOP Paphos
 APEP

Teams promoted from 1990–91 Cypriot Third Division
 Othellos
 Ethnikos Assia
 Apollon Lympion

Teams relegated to 1991–92 Cypriot Third Division
 Ermis Aradippou
 Ethnikos Defteras
 Elpida Xylofagou

League standings

Playoff

Promotion playoff
The 3rd-placed team, APEP Pitsilia, faced the 12th-placed team of the 1991–92 Cypriot First Division, Olympiakos Nicosia, in a two-legged relegation play-off for one spot in the 1992–93 Cypriot First Division. Olympiakos Nicosia won both matches and secured their place in the 1992–93 Cypriot First Division.

Olympiakos Nicosia 2–0 APEP Pitsilia
APEP Pitsilia 0–3 Olympiakos Nicosia

Relegation playoff
The 12th-placed team, Ethnikos Assia, faced the 3rd-placed team of the 1991–92 Cypriot Third Division, Adonis Idaliou, in a two-legged relegation play-off for one spot in the 1992–93 Cypriot Second Division. Ethnikos Assia won the playoff and secured their place in the 1992–93 Cypriot Second Division.

See also
 Cypriot Second Division
 1991–92 Cypriot First Division
 1991–92 Cypriot Cup

Sources

Cypriot Second Division seasons
Cyprus
1991–92 in Cypriot football